Seymitsa is a rural locality (a selo) in Prokhorovsky District, Belgorod Oblast, Russia. The population was 210 as of 2010. There are 2 streets.

Geography 
Seymitsa is located 25 km northeast of Prokhorovka (the district's administrative centre) by road. Khimichev is the nearest rural locality.

References 

Rural localities in Prokhorovsky District